To Be... is an EP by Taiwanese Mandopop artist Ella Chen, the member of girl group S.H.E. It was released on 30 March 2012 by HIM International Music and contains five tracks with one bonus song and also three additional demo tracks on the bonus cd.

Track listing

Bonus CD
 "NTC (NIKE 2012 Be Amazing運動宣言歌曲)"
 "330 (demo)"
 " 公主Selina (demo) - (Princess Selina)"

Music Videos

References

Ella Chen albums
2012 EPs
HIM International Music albums